Junior Rafael Alvarado (born May 20, 1986) is a jockey in the sport of Thoroughbred racing who rode his first winner on December 30, 2005, at La Rinconada Hippodrome near Caracas, Venezuela before moving to ride in the United States in 2007 where he got his first winner on February 17 at Gulfstream Park in Hallandale Beach, Florida.

Background
His father, Rafael Alvarado, was also a jockey in Venezuela. He had intended to record his son's birthname as Rafael Alvarado, Jr. but it was mistakenly registered as Junior Rafael Alvarado.

Triple Crown finishes
Junior Alvarado rode Mohaymen to a fourth-place finish in the 2016 Kentucky Derby and Enticed to a twelfth-place finish in the 2018 edition. In the 2012 Preakness Stakes he ran fourth aboard Zetterholm.

References

1986 births
Living people
American jockeys
Venezuelan jockeys
Sportspeople from Barquisimeto